Nicolas "Nic" Hague (born December 5, 1998) is a Canadian ice hockey defenceman for the Vegas Golden Knights of the National Hockey League (NHL). Hague was selected 34th overall by the Golden Knights in the 2017 NHL Entry Draft.

Playing career
Hague was drafted by the Mississauga Steelheads in the second round of the 2014 OHL Draft. Hague was later drafted 34th overall by the Vegas Golden Knights in the 2017 NHL Entry Draft.

Hague signed a three year entry level contract with the Golden Knights on September 29, 2017, and attended their training camp before rejoining the Steelheads for the 2017–18 season. Following a 2017–18 season where Hague led his team in scoring and set a Steelhead single season record for defencemen (78 points), Hague was awarded the Max Kaminsky Trophy, which is awarded to the OHL's Most Outstanding Defenceman of the Year. On April 8, following the Steelheads elimination from the 2018 OHL Playoffs, the Golden Knights assigned him to their American Hockey League (AHL) affiliate, the Chicago Wolves.

On January 21, 2020, Hague scored his first career NHL goal against the Boston Bruins on goaltender Jaroslav Halák.

Career statistics

Regular season and playoffs

International

Awards and honors

References

External links
 
 

1998 births
Living people
Canadian ice hockey defencemen
Chicago Wolves players
Ice hockey people from Ontario
Mississauga Steelheads players
Sportspeople from Kitchener, Ontario
Vegas Golden Knights draft picks
Vegas Golden Knights players